Konstantinovsky District  is the name of several administrative and municipal districts in Russia:
Konstantinovsky District, Amur Oblast, an administrative and municipal district of Amur Oblast
Konstantinovsky District, Rostov Oblast, an administrative and municipal district of Rostov Oblast

See also
Konstantinovsky (disambiguation)
Konstantinovskoye Municipal Okrug, a municipal okrug of Krasnoselsky District of Saint Petersburg

References